The Staff of Moses, also known as the Staff of God is a staff mentioned in the Bible and Quran as a walking stick used by Moses. According to the Book of Exodus, the staff ( matteh, translated "rod" in the King James Bible) was used to produce water from a rock, was transformed into a snake and back, and was used at the parting of the Red Sea. Whether the staff of Moses was the same as the staff used by his brother Aaron has been debated by rabbinical scholars.

References to the staff
The staff is first mentioned in the Book of Exodus (chapter 4, verse 2), when God appears to Moses in the burning bush. God asks what Moses has in his hand, and Moses answers  "a staff" ("a rod" in the KJV version). The staff is miraculously transformed into a snake and then back into a staff. The staff is thereafter referred to as the "rod of God" or "staff of God" (depending on the translation). 

"And thou shalt take this rod in thine hand, wherewith thou shalt do signs". And Moses went and returned to Jethro his father in law, and said unto him, "Let me go, I pray thee, and return unto my brethren which are in Egypt, and see whether they be yet alive". And Jethro said to Moses, "Go in peace". And the  said unto Moses in Midian, "Go, return into Egypt: for all the men are dead which sought thy life". And Moses took his wife and his sons, and set them upon an ass, and he returned to the land of Egypt: and Moses took the rod of God in his hand. (KJV. Exodus chapter 4)

Moses and Aaron appear before the pharaoh, and Aaron's rod is transformed into a serpent. Pharaoh's sorcerers are also able to transform their own rods into serpents, but Aaron's rod swallows their rods (Exodus 7:10-12). Aaron's rod is again used to turn the Nile blood-red. It is used several times on God's command to initiate the plagues of Egypt. 

During the Exodus, Moses stretches out his hand with the staff to part the Red Sea. While in the "wilderness" after leaving Egypt Moses follows God's command to strike a rock with the rod to create a spring for the Israelites to drink from (Exodus 17:5-7). Moses does so, and water springs forth from the rock in the presence of the Elders of Israel.  

Moses also uses the staff in the battle at Rephidim between the Israelites and the Amalekites (Exodus 17:8-16). When he holds up his arms holding the "rod of God" the Israelites "prevail", when he drops his arms, their enemies gain the upper hand. Aaron and Hur help him to keep the staff raised until victory is achieved.

Finally, God tells Moses to get water for the Israelites from a rock by speaking to the rock (Numbers 20:8). But Moses, being vexed by the complaining of the Israelites, instead of speaking to the rock as God commanded, strikes the rock twice with the staff. Because Moses did not obey God's command to speak to the rock, implying lack of faith, God punished Moses by not letting him enter into the Promised Land (Numbers 20:12).

Relation to Aaron's rod

Because Aaron's rod and Moses' rod are both given similar, seemingly interchangeable, powers, Rabbinical scholars debated whether or not the two rods were one and the same. According to the Midrash Yelammedenu (Yalḳ. on Ps. ex. § 869): 

the staff with which Jacob crossed the Jordan is identical with that which Judah gave to his daughter-in-law, Tamar (Gen. xxxii. 10, xxxviii. 18). It is likewise the holy rod with which Moses worked (Ex. iv. 20, 21), with which Aaron performed wonders before Pharaoh (Ex. vii. 10), and with which, finally, David slew the giant Goliath (I Sam. xvii. 40). David left it to his descendants, and the Davidic kings used it as a scepter until the destruction of the Temple, when it miraculously disappeared. When the Messiah comes it will be given to him for a scepter in token of his authority over the heathen.

In later Jewish legend the rod was said to have been created at the beginning of the world on the sixth day of creation and to have been passed down through the hands of the major patriarchs before being inherited by Moses.

Alleged present location

There are many speculations about what has happened to Moses's staff. 

The Midrash (a homiletic method of biblical exegesis) states that the staff was passed down from generation to generation and was in the possession of the Judean kings until the First Temple was destroyed. It is unknown what became of the staff after the Temple was destroyed and the Jews were exiled from the land.

There is a mention of the rod of Moses in a deposition of Nicolas, abbot of the Icelandic Benedictine monastery of Thingeyrar, who had seen it guarded in a chapel of a palace in Constantinople in c. 1150. According to this source, the archbishop of Novgorod, Anthony, stated that it was in the church of St Michael in the Boukoleon Palace, among other precious relics. After the sack of Constantinople in 1204 it was transported to France, where Bishop Nevelon placed it in Soissons cathedral and it then passed to the treasury of the Sainte-Chapelle. 

According to an identifying document at the Hagia Sophia in Istanbul, Moses's staff would supposedly be on display today at the Topkapı Palace, Istanbul, Turkey. The Topkapi Palace holds other reputedly holy relics, most notably those attributed to the Islamic prophet, Muhammad. (Such as his bow, his sword, his footprint, and even a tooth.) Topkapı Palace was officially designated a museum in 1924, and the holy relics were placed on public view on 31 August 1962. It is said that Sultan Selim I (1512–1520) brought the holy relics to Topkapi Palace after conquering Egypt in 1517.

Shia Islam

It is narrated in Kitab al-Kafi that Ja'far al-Sadiq claims that the "Tablets of Moses and the Staff of Moses are with us. We are the heirs of the Prophets".

See also
 Crosier
 Caduceus
 Nehushtan
 List of mythological objects
 Magic wand
 Margna used by Mandaean priests

References

Moses
Hebrew Bible objects
Book of Exodus
Walking sticks